Cazarilh-Laspènes (before 2014: Cazaril-Laspènes) is a commune in the Haute-Garonne department in southwestern France. Prior to 2014, It was known as Cazaril-Laspènes.

Population

See also
Communes of the Haute-Garonne department

References

Communes of Haute-Garonne